Rights of Swing is an album led by saxophonist Phil Woods featuring performances recorded in early 1961 and originally released on the Candid label.

Reception

The contemporaneous DownBeat reviewer, Ira Gitler, mentioned the influence of Igor Stravinsky on the album and wrote that: "Woods' virile alto shows the way, but all the soloists and supporting rhythm men are of consistently high quality." Scott Yanow of AllMusic says, "The colorful arrangements use the distinctive horns in inventive fashion and the music (which leaves room for many concise solos) holds one's interest throughout. One of Phil Woods' finest recordings, it's a true gem".

Track listing
All compositions by Phil Woods.

 "Prelude and Part I" - 7:00
 "Part II (Ballad)" - 7:38
 "Part III (Waltz)" - 5:39
 "Part IV (Scherzo)" - 11:19
 "Part V (Presto)" - 7:17

Personnel
Phil Woods - alto saxophone
Benny Bailey - trumpet
Julius Watkins - French horn
Willie Dennis (track 5), Curtis Fuller (tracks 1-4) - trombone
Sahib Shihab - baritone saxophone
Tommy Flanagan - piano
Buddy Catlett - bass
Osie Johnson (tracks 1-4), Mickey Roker (track 5) - drums

References

Candid Records albums
Phil Woods albums
1961 albums
Albums produced by Nat Hentoff